Stewart Bryan Cole (born February 7, 1966) is an American former professional baseball infielder and current coach. He is the third base coach for the Colorado Rockies of Major League Baseball (MLB). Cole played in MLB Kansas City Royals.

Career
Cole attended South Mecklenburg High School in Charlotte, North Carolina. He was drafted by the Pittsburgh Pirates in the 19th round of the 1984 MLB draft, but did not sign and attended the University of North Carolina at Charlotte. He was drafted by the Kansas City Royals with the 67th pick in the 3rd round of the 1987 MLB draft, just three spots ahead of future Rockies legend John Vander Wal.

He played in professional baseball from 1987 through 1995 in the Kansas City Royals and Colorado Rockies organizations. He played nine game in MLB for the Royals in 1991. His only hit came on September 13, a 12th inning single off of Michael Jackson of the Seattle Mariners.

Cole has been a coach in the Rockies organization since 1995. In 2001, he became the first manager of the Tri-City Dust Devils in franchise history. He managed the Double-A Tulsa Drillers from 2006 to 2009, and was named manager of the Triple-A Colorado Springs Sky Sox in May 2009. He was named third base coach for the Rockies on November 15, 2012. It was announced that the Rockies were reassigning Cole to a minor league staff position following the 2022 season.

References

External links

1966 births
Living people
African-American baseball coaches
African-American baseball players
Baseball coaches from North Carolina
Baseball players from North Carolina
Charlotte 49ers baseball players
Colorado Rockies (baseball) coaches
Major League Baseball infielders
Major League Baseball third base coaches
Colorado Springs Sky Sox managers
Kansas City Royals players
Eugene Emeralds players
Virginia Generals players
Baseball City Royals players
Memphis Chicks players
Omaha Royals players
Colorado Springs Sky Sox players
21st-century African-American people
20th-century African-American sportspeople